Perkiomen School is an independent, co-educational, college preparatory, boarding and day school school located in Pennsburg, Pennsylvania, in the United States. Perkiomen admits students in grades 6–12 and offers a year for postgraduate students. Perkiomen was founded in 1875 by a descendant of a Schwenkfelder immigrant. In 2019, it enrolled 330 students.

Admissions

Campus

The campus features six dormitories, a dining hall, a health center, and faculty housing. Athletic facilities include an athletic center with a swimming pool, two gymnasiums, weight, and wrestling rooms, a weight room, a wrestling room, eight tennis courts, multiple athletic fields, an indoor batting cage, and an outdoor batting cage.

The campus includes six academic buildings. The original "old main" school building, Kriebel Hall, was renovated in 1995 after being extensively damaged in a fire. In 2007, Perkiomen opened The Robert M. Schumo Academic Center, which includes science and computer laboratories, a conference room, and new classrooms.

Motto
The school's motto is Solvitur vivendo, "it is solved by living". Alternative translations include "experience is the best teacher", "we learn through experience", or "the learning is in the doing".

References

External links
 
Boarding School Review profile

Boarding schools in Pennsylvania
Private high schools in Pennsylvania
Private middle schools in Pennsylvania
Preparatory schools in Pennsylvania
Educational institutions established in 1875
Schools in Montgomery County, Pennsylvania
1875 establishments in Pennsylvania